Zhou Tienong (born November 1938) is a Chinese politician. He served as Vice Chairman of the Standing Committee of the National People's Congress, Chairman of the Revolutionary Committee of the Kuomintang, and Vice-Governor of Heilongjiang Province. He studied at Peking University from 1955 to 1960.

References

1938 births
Living people
Peking University alumni
Members of the Revolutionary Committee of the Chinese Kuomintang
Vice Chairpersons of the National People's Congress
Politicians from Shenyang
People's Republic of China politicians from Liaoning
Political office-holders in Heilongjiang
Vice Chairpersons of the National Committee of the Chinese People's Political Consultative Conference
Members of the 7th Chinese People's Political Consultative Conference
Members of the Standing Committee of the 8th Chinese People's Political Consultative Conference
Delegates to the 11th National People's Congress